Chiweshe is an African surname. Notable people with the surname include:

Ellen Chiweshe, Zimbabwean Air Force officer
George Chiweshe (born 1953), Chairperson of the Zimbabwe Electoral Commission
Stella Chiweshe (born 1946), Zimbabwean musician

Surnames of African origin